Juan Carlos Lezcano López (born 5 November 1938) is a Paraguayan retired footballer who played as a forward and later as a midfielder, primarily in Spain, where he is considered one of Elche CF's most important players.

Career
Born in Asunción to a father who was a footballer, Lezcano began playing football as a youth with local side Club Olimpia. He first played senior footballer with Chilean side Club Deportivo Universidad Católica. Despite being scouted by Spanish agents, he joined Universidad Católica's rivals Santiago Morning in 1961. The following season Lezcano moved to Spain, joining Elche CF.

Lezcano played nine La Liga seasons with Elche, scoring 42 goals in 213 league appearances. He was a key figure for the club as it reached  the 1969 Copa del Generalísimo Final - Elche's highest profile moment.

After he retired from playing, Lezcano became a football coach. He managed Elche CF Ilicitano in 1976, and was assistant manager to Felipe Mesones for the parent club in 1977. Lezcano has also acted as a caretaker manager for Elche on three occasions.

References

External links

1938 births
Living people
Paraguayan footballers
Club Deportivo Universidad Católica footballers
Santiago Morning footballers
Elche CF players
CD Eldense footballers
Association football midfielders
La Liga players